The 1953 New York Yankees season was the 51st season for the team. The team finished with a record of 99–52, winning their 20th pennant, finishing 8.5 games ahead of the Cleveland Indians. New York was managed by Casey Stengel. The Yankees played their home games at Yankee Stadium. In the World Series, they defeated the Brooklyn Dodgers in 6 games. This was the Yankees fifth consecutive World Series win, a record that still stands.

Regular season

Season standings

Record vs. opponents

Roster

Player stats

Batting

Starters by position
Note: Pos = Position; G = Games played; AB = At bats; H = Hits; Avg. = Batting average; HR = Home runs; RBI = Runs batted in

Other batters
Note: G = Games played; AB = At bats; H = Hits; Avg. = Batting average; HR = Home runs; RBI = Runs batted in

Pitching

Starting pitchers
Note: G = Games pitched; IP = Innings pitched; W = Wins; L = Losses; ERA = Earned run average; SO = Strikeouts

Other pitchers
Note: G = Games pitched; IP = Innings pitched; W = Wins; L = Losses; ERA = Earned run average; SO = Strikeouts

Relief pitchers
Note: G = Games pitched; W = Wins; L = Losses; SV = Saves; ERA = Earned run average; SO = Strikeouts

1953 World Series 

AL New York Yankees (4) vs. NL Brooklyn Dodgers (2)

Awards and honors
 Billy Martin, Babe Ruth Award
 Yogi Berra, Runner-up, American League MVP 
All-Star Game

Farm system

LEAGUE CHAMPIONS: Kansas City, Binghamton, Quincy, Norfolk, McAlester

Notes

References
1953 New York Yankees at Baseball Reference
1953 World Series
1953 New York Yankees team page at www.baseball-almanac.com

New York Yankees seasons
New York Yankees
New York Yankees
1950s in the Bronx
American League champion seasons
World Series champion seasons